Three ships of the Royal Navy have borne the name HMS Nile, after the Battle of the Nile in 1798:

 was a 12-gun cutter purchased in 1806. This may have been the former hired armed cutter . HMS Nile was put up for sale in October 1810, and sold, but the purchaser rejected her; she was subsequently broken up in 1811.
 was a 92-gun second-rate ship of the line launched in 1839. She was converted to screw propulsion in 1854, renamed HMS Conway in 1876 whilst on loan as a training ship, and was burnt in 1956.
 was a  launched in 1888 and sold in 1912.

In addition, the Royal Navy base at Ras el-Tin Point, Alexandria, Egypt, which operated between April 1939 and June 1946, was officially referred to as HMS Nile.

See also

Citations

References

Royal Navy ship names